Mixed Doubles: An Entertainment on Marriage (London: Methuen, 1970) is a programme consisting of a series of eight short plays or revue sketches, each with two characters, composed by various English playwrights.  It was first performed on 6 February 1969 in the Hampstead Theatre Club with the title, We Who Are About To....  The programme was then presented as Mixed Doubles: An Entertainment on Marriage at the Comedy Theatre, London, on 9 April 1969.

The eight dramatic sketches, each portraying marriage at a different stage of life, are linked together by a series of anti-authoritarian monologues written by George Melly.  Taken together, the programme presents an acidly humorous image of marriage from the moment of blessing until the silver wedding anniversary.  In the course of the programme, many people appear on stage in various professional capacities.  The characters in Mixed Doubles appear to be plagued by everyday trivialities, their pasts, their jobs, and their marital problems.

The revue sketches
"The Vicar", by George Melly
"A Man's Best Friend", by James Saunders
"The Bank Manager", by George Melly
"Score", by Lyndon Brook
"The Lawyer", by George Melly
"Norma", by Alun Owen
"The Nannie", by George Melly
"Night", by Harold Pinter
"The Psychoanalyst", by George Melly
"Permanence", by Fay Weldon
"The Doctor", by George Melly
"Countdown", by Alan Ayckbourn
"The Union Official", by George Melly
"The Silver Wedding", by John Griffith Bowen
"The Director", by George Melly
"Resting Place", by David Campton

Two other monologues by George Melly, "The Headmaster" and "The Advertising Man", were included in the published version as an appendix.

On "Countdown," by Alan Ayckbourn, from "One Act Plays" (alanayckbourn.net):

References

External links
Countdown on official Ayckbourn website

British plays
1969 plays